Çiler İlhan is a Turkish-Dutch writer. She studied International Relations and Political Science at Boğaziçi University and hotel management at the Glion Hotel School in Switzerland. She has variously worked as an hotelier, a writer and an editor.

İlhan has been an active writer since her youth. In 1993, she won the Yaşar Nabi Nayır Youth Awards award for one of her short stories. She regularly publishes stories, essays, book reviews, travel pieces and translations in newspapers and magazines. Her first book "Rüya Tacirleri Odası" "(Chamber of Dream Merchants", Artemis, April 2006) is a collection of short stories that allude to one another. Her second book entitled "Sürgün" ("Exile", Everest, March 2010) contains interconnected stories whose themes range from the invasion of Iraq to women from Batman, and the fate of laboratory. Sürgün (Exile) won the EU Prize for Literature 2011, and was translated and published into English by Istros Books, London in 2016.  Exile, shortlisted also for Prix Du Livre Lorientales 2017, has so far been published in over 20 countries. Based on the true story of an extremely cruel murder, Nişan Evi (Engagement, Everest, 2021) is a captivating novella, told in a unique voice, reflecting the lives that are erased and lost under the weight of various power centers—ranging from the official to the secretive—amidst the intertwined way of life in eastern Turkey. İlhan,'s stories and articles were selected for over 15 prominent national and international anthologies. She is a member of Turkish and Dutch PEN.

References

1972 births
Boğaziçi University alumni
Turkish women short story writers
Living people